Mike Reno (born Joseph Michael Rynoski; born January 8, 1955) is a Canadian musician, singer and the lead singer of the rock band Loverboy. He is reported to have taught himself how to play guitar. He fronted other bands, including Moxy, before helping form Loverboy. Reno also sang for the Canadian band Hammersmith in 1976.

Life and career
While still in school in the early 1970s, Reno joined a cover band called Morning Glory, in which he played the drums and eventually found his way to the cover band Synergy. Later, Reno moved on to a band called Spunk with guitarist Jack Stoltz. After graduating from Penticton Secondary School, Reno  briefly joined the band Moxy for a single album, Under the Lights, released in 1978. It was something of a departure from the previous Moxy albums, partially because of changes in band members as well as Reno's different singing style, and did not sell as well as the band's earlier releases. Eventually, Reno was introduced to Paul Dean in 1979 at a nightclub called The Refinery and they immediately got together for a jam session, which led to the formation of Loverboy shortly thereafter. Loverboy released its first album in 1980 and the band went on to tour extensively as well as release three more multi-platinum albums between 1981 and 1985. Loverboy's last full album of original material in the 1980s was Wildside (1987), though they included three new original songs on the compilation album Big Ones (1989).

Reno has also contributed to various film soundtracks. In 1984, he performed a duet with Ann Wilson of Heart, "Almost Paradise", for the movie Footloose. With Loverboy, the band contributed "Heaven in Your Eyes" for the movie Top Gun (1986). Reno contributed the song "Chasing the Angels" for the soundtrack to Iron Eagle II (1988) along with the song "Whenever There's a Night" for the movie Dream a Little Dream (1989). Reno also reportedly recorded a cover of "Never Been to Spain", a song that was originally written by Hoyt Axton and recorded by Three Dog Night for their album Harmony (1971). The Three Dog Night version went to #1 on the charts. In 1990 Reno co-wrote and performed the song 'All I Ever Needed' from the David Foster Album River of Love. In 2003, artist Tim Feehan released a solo album Tracks I Forgot About containing a song that features Reno on vocals, "Call of the Wild".

In the late 1990s, during a VH1 interview, Reno attributed the decline of Loverboy to the rise of grunge bands such as Pearl Jam and Nirvana.

In 2002, Reno released his first solo album titled Renovation. The album is composed of ten tracks closely resembling the sound of his work with Loverboy, although some discs contain a bonus track titled "Guilty as Charged." The album was reportedly recorded in 1992, and was supposed to be released by Sony but they chose instead to indefinitely shelve the project due to changes in the music industry--the changes touched on by Reno in his previously mentioned VH1 interview. Reno eventually proceeded to release the un-mastered recordings from his own archival tapes on his now defunct website but went on to release the album widely on a variety of sources. The main complaint amongst critics and fans is a lack of mastering, overall production and polishing commonly found on finished albums... but hard core fans and critics seem to feel the album is more than worthy of attention in spite of this.

Loverboy had a headlining spot at the 2007 Grey Cup party in Toronto. At the 2009 Juno Awards, Reno was inducted into the Canadian Music Hall of Fame as a member of Loverboy. Loverboy also played as a part of the 2010 Olympic ceremonies in Vancouver on Sunday February 21, 2010. This night, otherwise known as "Nunavut night", was co-headlined with the band Trooper. The live medal presentations were in short track speed skating (ladies' 1,500 m and men's 1,000 m), men's 1,500-metre speed skating and men's freestyle skiing ski cross.

The band's latest full album of all-new material is Unfinished Business, released on July 15, 2014, through Loverboy Music. As of 2015, Reno continues to tour and play live shows with Loverboy.

Discography

Studio albums
Renovation (2002)

with Moxy
Under the Lights (1978)

with Loverboy
 Loverboy (1980)
 Get Lucky (1981)
 Keep It Up (1983)
 Lovin' Every Minute of It (1985)
 Wildside (1987)
 Six (1997)
 Just Getting Started (2007)
 Rock 'n' Roll Revival (2012)
 Unfinished Business (2014)

with Just·If·I
All One People (1993)

Guest appearances

Soundtrack appearances

References

External links
 
 

1955 births
Living people
Canadian people of Polish descent
Canadian hard rock musicians
Canadian male singers
Canadian new wave musicians
Canadian rock singers
Juno Award for Songwriter of the Year winners
Loverboy members
People from New Westminster